is a Shinto shrine in the Ōgaki neighborhood of the city of Miyazu in Kyoto Prefecture, Japan. It is the ichinomiya of former Tango Province.

Enshrined kami
The primary kami enshrined at Kono Jinja is:
 , god of the sun and agriculture

The secondary kami are:
 ,  goddess of agriculture and industry
 , goddess of the sun
 , water deity

History
According to the legend of this shrine, Toyouke-Ōmikami was originally enshrined that this location before being relocated to the Outer Shrine of the Ise Grand Shrine during the reign of Emperor Yūryaku to offer sacred food to Amaterasu Ōmikami, the Sun Goddess. The main kami enshrined was changed to Amenohoakari in 719 by the 27th generation kannushi, but Toyouke-Ōmikami retained as a secondary object of worship.The shrine and its rituals are described in both the Kojiki and the Nihon Shoki. It was located immediately to the west of the site of the Tango provincial capital.

The shrine consists of an upper and lower portion. The lower shrine is the Honden and is a Shinmei-zukuri structure with a cypress bark roof. It was rebuilt in 1845 and is designated as a Tangible Cultural Property of Kyoto Prefecture

During the Meiji period era of State Shinto, the shrine was designated as a  under the Modern system of ranked Shinto Shrines

The shrine is located next to the Ama-no-Hashidate.

Cultural Properties

NationalTreasures
, early Heian period, it is considered the oldest family tree in Japan.The clan claims descent from Amenohoakari, and served as at the kuni no miyatsuko of Tanba Province before it was divided into Tamba and Tango.The document records 82 generations of descent from Amenohoakari. It was designated a National Treasure in 1972.

National Important Cultural Properties
{{nihongo|Biane|扁額}}, wooden, Heian period, inscribed "Kago no Daimyōjin", dated 976.
{{nihongo|Komainu|狛犬||}}, stone, Momoyama period.
 , Heian period, consisting of two copper cylinders, one mirror with a design of chrysanthemum, and mirror with a line drawing of a Buddha, dated 1188

Gallery

See also
List of Shinto shrines
List of National Treasures of Japan (ancient documents)
Ichinomiya

References
 Plutschow, Herbe. Matsuri: The Festivals of Japan. RoutledgeCurzon (1996) 
 Ponsonby-Fane, Richard Arthur Brabazon. (1959).  The Imperial House of Japan. Kyoto: Ponsonby Memorial Society. OCLC 194887

External links

Official home page

Notes

Shinto shrines in Kyoto Prefecture
Tango Province
Miyazu, Kyoto
Ichinomiya
Important Cultural Properties of Japan
National Treasures of Japan
Beppyo shrines